Sugar Pine Lumber Company No.4, (SPL No.4) Later known as PALCO 37, W&C 37, and WWRR 37, is a 2-8-2T Mikado built by the American Locomotive Works in 1925. After the Sugar Pine Lumber Company went bankrupt in 1933, it wound later be purchased by Pacific Lumber Company and renumbered to No. 37. The engine was briefly purchased to railfan Frank Bayliss before starting its heritage railroad career on the Wawa & Concord Ville Railroad in 1966.

The engine is currently awaiting restoration to operational condition at the Strasburg Railroad for the Timber Heritage Association.

Gallery

References 

2-8-2 locomotives
1925 introductions